Events in the year 1711 in Norway.

Incumbents
Monarch: Frederick IV

Events

Arts and literature

Births

27 July – Christian Ancher, merchant, timber trader and ship owner (died 1765).

Deaths

See also

References